The New Lisbon Correctional Institution is a state prison for men located in New Lisbon, Juneau County, Wisconsin, owned and operated by the Wisconsin Department of Corrections.  The facility opened in 2002 and holds 950 inmates at medium security.

References

Prisons in Wisconsin
Buildings and structures in Juneau County, Wisconsin
2004 establishments in Wisconsin